Jiri-ye Sofla (also Romanized as Jīrī-ye Soflá) is a village in Cham Khalaf-e Isa Rural District, Cham Khalaf-e Isa District, Hendijan County, Khuzestan Province, Iran. At the 2006 census, its population was 339, in 64 families.

References 

Populated places in Hendijan County